Iide is a village in Saaremaa Municipality, Saare County, Estonia, located on the Sõrve peninsula on the island of Saaremaa. Prior to the 2017 administrative reforms of Estonian municipalities, it was the  administrative centre of Torgu Parish. Iide has a population of 67.

References

Villages in Saare County